Pizza II: Villa is a 2013 Indian Tamil-language horror-thriller film written and directed by debutant Deepan Chakravarthy. It is the second installment in the Pizza (film series). The film stars Ashok Selvan and Sanchita Shetty in lead roles, while Nassar and Vegan Rajesh appear in other pivotal roles The music for the film was composed by Santhosh Narayanan, while cinematography was handled by Deepak Kumar Padhy and Leo John Paul has done the editing. Produced jointly by Thirukumaran Entertainment and Studio Green, Pizza II: Villa is a spiritual successor to Pizza (2012). The filming commenced on 17 April and was completed in May 2013. The film released in November 2013 to positive reviews from the critics and audience.

Plot
A debutant English crime novel writer Jebin M. Jose discovers that his deceased father had run bankrupt with an unlisted property in Pondicherry. To pay off the debts, he makes a visit to the villa for valuation. But after seeing framed paintings by his father, he calls his girlfriend Aarthi, who is an art student, to accompany him to the villa. She immediately likes both the villa and the mysterious paintings. She particularly shows interest in one dual faced painting.

Aarthi urges Jebin not to sell the villa. Within a few days time, Jebin's career gets a new break when an established publisher comes forward to buy rights for his first novel Maybe, Maybe Not!. He also gets advance  in a two-book contract. Seeing this as a sign, Jebin continues to stay at the villa in hopes it will bring him good luck while starting to work on his second novel The Director. Meanwhile, Aarthi returns to Chennai to seek permission from her father for their marriage, leaving Jebin alone in the villa.

One night, an ecstatic Jebin plays the Victorian piano. The strings get jammed abruptly. He opens the lid and finds a secret key underneath. Jebin also gets curious on the remarkable geometry of one of the paintings which appears to be more like a map than a work of art. He notices that it is similar to the floor plan of the villa given to him by his lawyer. As he probes each room in the villa, he stumbles upon a secret door behind a wardrobe. He uses the secret key to open the lock and discovers plenty of paintings rolled up inside a trunk. Many scenes appear to have come straight out of his own life, like his mother's death by car accident. Jebin slowly realises that his father had precognition skills and concludes that his paintings may predict future events.

Not too long after that, Jebin wins a prestigious literary award and critical acclaim for his debut novel, as depicted in one of his father's paintings. However, he gets overwhelmed by this unexplained occurrence and tries to sell off the villa. During the process, the estate agent gets injured in a freak accident by the cast-iron gate, scaring away potential buyers who view this as a bad omen. Frustrated, Jebin furiously tries to complete his second novel. When Aarthi returns from Chennai, Jebin tells her about his discovery. They decide to burn all the paintings in the secret room. But almost instinctively, the secret room defends itself by toppling furniture and fittings to block their entry.

Jebin's best friend advises him to consult a renowned parapsychologist, Devanesan to find a solution. Devanesan conjectures that the villa may have the left-over negative energy of prior owners as symptoms manifest psychic phenomena. Jebin also finds the identities and whereabouts of prior owners. But all report similar grim events in their lives like infanticide, lunacy, fratricide, disease, insolvency, death, et al. Devanesan also suggests that Jebin's father may have found an outlet, in his passion for paintings, to survive this negative energy which can neither be created nor destroyed but only transferred. He then begins to conduct more experiments using a tuning fork within the villa compound. But all hell break loose midway and apparitions begin to appear. In the chaos, Jebin's best friend loses his legs. Jebin even finds some paintings depicting a man and a woman getting married, and the man eventually killing the woman. Assuming that his father predicted that he would end up killing Aarthi, Jebin sets fire to himself and the villa to prevent him from harming the girl he loves.

When Aarthi sees that Jebin has taken his own life before legally marrying her, she realises she has no claim over his estate. It is then revealed that Aarthi's true intentions were indicated by the dual faced painting she liked when she visited the villa. She had hoped to secure the money Jebin would gain from his book sale and selling the villa. With Jebin dead, Aarthi quickly seduces and marries an up-and-coming movie director.

However, it is revealed that Aarthi's killer in the painting that Jebin assumed was him is actually Aarthi's new husband, the movie director. Thus, it can be understood that Jebin did not realise that he too inherited his father's gift, with his second novel depicting that a "director" character would soon appear in the prophecy..

Cast

Production
After Pizza became successful, young software professional and short filmmaker Deepan Chakravarthy came up with the idea of making a sequel. He wrote the script in three weeks and submitted it to the producer, who thought of building it up as a franchise. Thirukumaran Entertainment who produced Pizza produce the sequel too. In March 2013, Studio Green secured the film and co-produced it. Abinesh Elangovan of Abi & Abi Pictures bought the theatrical rights of the movie.

Vaibhav Reddy and Sanchita Shetty were cast as the lead pair at first. Later it was said that K.E. Gnanavel Raja of Studio Green, chose to remove Vaibhav and Sanchita from the cast to replace them with bigger names. But Sanchita was retained and Vaibhav only was replaced by Ashok Selvan, who were both part of the hit film Soodhu Kavvum. Deepan said that most of the actors of Pizza are part of Villa as well, but were playing different characters. Ashok Selvan plays a 30-year-old writer in the film, and Sanchitha plays lover of the hero in the film. S. J. Suryah was also added to the cast, but his role was not disclosed to the public. Nevertheless, Suryah played guest appearance in the film.

A song sequence, a romantic number at that, called Aayiram Enngal was filmed at Luz Church, Mylapore. Pizza II : Villa will have Dolby Atmos sound.
A one-minute teaser on the film was released on 15 June 2013.

Soundtrack

The soundtrack album was composed by Santhosh Narayanan, with lyrics penned by GKB and Arunraja Kamaraj. The album was released at the Suryan FM Radio Station, Chennai on 3 September 2013 in the presence of actor Prasanna. Think Music purchased the audio rights for the album.

Sequel
On 1 January 2021, A third sequel in the Pizza franchise has been announced by Producer CV Kumar. Starring Ashwin Kakamanu, The film is directed by debutant Mohan Govind and produced by CV Kumar's Thirukumaran Entertainment. The announcement poster was launched by directors Karthik Subbaraj, Pa Ranjith and Ram Kumar, whose debut projects  Pizza, Attakathi and Mundasupatti  were produced by CV Kumar.

On October 15, A Teaser was released on Vasy Music Entertainment. The film is titled as Pizza 3: The Mummy and the film is set to release in April 2022.

References

External links
 

2013 films
2013 horror thriller films
Indian horror thriller films
Indian sequel films
Films shot in Chennai
2010s Tamil-language films
2013 directorial debut films